Arena Garibaldi – Stadio Romeo Anconetani (usually referred to just as Arena Garibaldi) is a multi-use stadium in Pisa, Italy.  It is currently used mostly for football matches and is the home ground of Pisa S.C..  The stadium holds 25,000 (14,869 approved) and was opened in 1919.

History

International matches
Four international matches of the Italy national football team have taken place at the stadium:

References

Garibaldi
Garibaldi